This article provides two lists:
A list of National Basketball Association players by total career regular season rebounds recorded.
A progressive list of rebound leaders showing how the record has increased through the years.

Rebounding leaders
This is a list of National Basketball Association players by total career regular season rebounds recorded.
Statistics accurate as of March 16, 2023.

Progressive list of rebounding leaders
This is a progressive list of rebounding leaders showing how the record increased through the years.
Statistics accurate as of March 16, 2023.

See also
Basketball statistics
NBA regular season records

Notes

References

External links
Basketball-Reference.com enumeration of NBA career leaders in total rebounds
National Basketball Association official website enumeration of NBA career leaders in total rebounds

National Basketball Association lists
National Basketball Association statistical leaders